The 1994–95 Ranji Trophy was the 61st season of the Ranji Trophy, the premier first-class cricket tournament that took place in India between December 1994 and March 1995. Bombay won the tournament defeating Punjab in the final on first innings lead.

Teams 
The teams were drawn in the following groups:

Central Zone
 Madhya Pradesh
 Railways
 Rajasthan
 Uttar Pradesh
 Vidarbha

East Zone
 Assam
 Bengal
 Bihar
 Orissa
 Tripura

North Zone
 Delhi
 Haryana
 Services
 Punjab
 Himachal Pradesh
 Jammu & Kashmir

South Zone
 Andhra
 Hyderabad
 Karnataka
 Kerala
 Tamil Nadu
 Goa

West Zone
 Baroda
 Gujarat
 Maharashtra
 Bombay
 Saurashtra

Group stage 
The teams in each group were ranked according to points. 6 points were awarded for an 'out-right win', 3 for a tied, 2 when first-innings lead was retained despite being beaten 'out-right' and when scores of first innings were tied in a 'no out-right result' game, 1 when match was lost 'out-right' after a first innings tie or abandoned without a ball being bowled or when a match ended in a draw without a first innings result. No points were awarded when a team lost on first innings score and later the match.

Knockout stage

Quarter-finals

Semi-finals

Final

References

External links
 Ranji Trophy, 1994-95 at ESPN Cricinfo
 

1995 in Indian cricket
Domestic cricket competitions in 1994–95
Ranji Trophy seasons